"Town of Plenty" is a song by English musician Elton John from the album Reg Strikes Back and was released in 1988. The song was the first album track to be heard after John's throat surgery. Pete Townshend of The Who plays acoustic guitar on the track, while Davey Johnstone plays electric. Among the backing vocalists contributing to the track are Elton's former bandmates Nigel Olsson and Dee Murray. This would be the final album of Elton John that Murray would contribute to, prior to his death from a stroke in 1992.

The single release of "Town of Plenty" was the second to be issued from Reg Strikes Back in the United Kingdom where it barely charted; it reached number 74 (one place above the lowest chart position available in 1988) and was gone by the next week. The single was not released in the USA. 

A limited edition 7-inch single was also issued, which included four postcards, each depicting John in a particular stage costume. This coincided with John's Sotheby's auction in which the costumes pictured were sold.

B-side
The B-side to the single was "Whipping Boy" from the album Too Low for Zero, which was released five years earlier. A CD single of the release was also issued; this contained the two aforementioned tracks as well as "Saint" and "I Guess That's Why They Call It the Blues", also from Too Low for Zero.

Charts

Personnel 
 Elton John – Roland RD-1000 digital piano, lead and harmony vocals
 Fred Mandel – synthesizers
 Davey Johnstone – electric guitar, backing vocals
 Pete Townshend – acoustic guitar
 David Paton – bass
 Charlie Morgan – drums
 Dee Murray – backing vocals
 Nigel Olsson –  backing vocals

References

1988 singles
Elton John songs
Songs with music by Elton John
Songs with lyrics by Bernie Taupin
Song recordings produced by Chris Thomas (record producer)
Music videos directed by Russell Mulcahy
1988 songs
The Rocket Record Company singles